In professional wrestling, championships are competed for in scripted storylines by a promotion's roster of contracted wrestlers.  Impact Wrestling (formerly Total Nonstop Action Wrestling (TNA)) is a Nashville, Tennessee-based professional wrestling promotion. The promotion was founded in 2002; in the company's 19-year history, fourteen different unique championships, some originating from other promotions, have been promoted by Impact and later abandoned by the promotion. The following is a list of the promotion's former championships that were once active and contended for by its roster.

Defunct championships promoted by Impact
This section of championships are a list of titles which were exclusive to Impact.
Sanctioned

Unsanctioned

Past championships used by Impact

See also
List of current champions in Impact Wrestling

Notes

References

External links

 
Impact Wrestling champions lists